The 2020–21 Rider Broncs men's basketball team represented Rider University in the 2020–21 NCAA Division I men's basketball season. The Broncs, led by ninth-year head coach Kevin Baggett, played their home games at the Alumni Gymnasium in Lawrenceville, New Jersey as members of the Metro Atlantic Athletic Conference. They finished the season 6–17, 5–13 in MAAC play to finish in last place. As the No. 11 seed in the MAAC tournament, they defeated No. 6 seed Canisius in the first round before losing in the quarterfinals to No. 3 seed Saint Peter's 60–75.

Previous season
The Broncs finished the 2019–20 season 18–12 overall, 12–8 in MAAC play to finish in a tie for third place. Before they could face #6 seeded Niagara in the MAAC tournament quarterfinals, all postseason tournaments were cancelled amid the COVID-19 pandemic.

Roster

Schedule and results 

|-
!colspan=12 style=| Regular season

|-
!colspan=12 style=| MAAC tournament
|-

|-

Sources

References

Rider Broncs men's basketball seasons
Rider Broncs
Rider Broncs men's basketball
Rider Broncs men's basketball